Daniel Mandell (August 13, 1895 - June 8, 1987) was an American film editor with more than 70 film credits. His first editing credit was for The Turmoil in 1924. From Dodsworth (1936) to Porgy and Bess (1959), Mandell worked for Samuel Goldwyn Productions. He had notable collaborations with directors William Wyler (1933–1946) and Billy Wilder (1957–1966). Mandell's last credit was for The Fortune Cookie in 1966. 

Mandell won the Academy Award for Best Film Editing for The Pride of the Yankees (1942; directed by Sam Wood), The Best Years of Our Lives (1946; directed by William Wyler), and The Apartment (1960; directed by Billy Wilder). No editor has won more than three Academy Awards, and only three others have won three times: Ralph Dawson, Michael Kahn, and Thelma Schoonmaker. Mandell was nominated for the Academy Award for two additional films, The Little Foxes (1941; directed by William Wyler) and Witness for the Prosecution (1957; directed by Billy Wilder).

Additional credits include  Holiday (1930), Counsellor at Law (1933), Dodsworth (1936), Wuthering Heights (1939), Meet John Doe (1941), The North Star (1943), Enchantment (1948), Roseanna McCoy (1949), Guys and Dolls (1955), and Kiss Me, Stupid (1964).

See also
List of film director and editor collaborations

External links

References

Further reading

1895 births
1987 deaths
Artists from New York City
American film editors
Best Film Editing Academy Award winners